Schacht is a German surname, derived from the common noun meaning "mine shaft".

Surname
 Emil Schacht (1854–1915), American architect, German immigrant
 Hermann Schacht (1814–1864), German botanist and pharmacist
 Hjalmar Schacht (1877–1970), German financial expert during the time of Hitler
 Joseph Schacht (1902–1969), German Catholic scholar of Islamic Law
 Henry Schacht (born 1933/1934), American businessman
 Richard Schacht (born 1941), American philosopher
 Chris Schacht (born 1946), Australian politician

Other uses
Schacht (automobile), an American manufacturer of automobile, trucks and fire trucks from 1904 to 1940
Schacht-Audorf, in Schleswig-Holstein, Germany
Schacht v. United States, a United States Supreme Court case (1970)